In fluid dynamics, the no-slip condition for viscous fluids assumes that at a solid boundary, the fluid will have zero velocity relative to the boundary.

The fluid velocity at all fluid–solid boundaries is equal to that of the solid boundary. Conceptually, one can think of the outermost molecules of fluid as stuck to the surfaces past which it flows. Because the solution is prescribed at given locations, this is an example of a Dirichlet boundary condition.

Physical justification
Particles close to a surface do not move along with a flow when adhesion is stronger than cohesion.
At the fluid-solid interface, the force of attraction between the fluid particles and solid particles (Adhesive forces) is greater than that between the fluid particles (Cohesive forces). This force imbalance brings down the fluid velocity to zero.
The no slip condition is only defined for viscous flows and where continuum concept is valid.

Exceptions
As with most of the engineering approximations, the no-slip condition does not always hold in reality. For example, at very low pressure (e.g. at high altitude), even when the continuum approximation still holds there may be so few molecules near the surface that they "bounce along" down the surface. A common approximation for fluid slip is:

Some highly hydrophobic surfaces have also been observed to have a nonzero but nanoscale slip length.

While the no-slip condition is used almost universally in modeling of viscous flows, it is sometimes neglected in favor of the 'no-penetration condition' (where the fluid velocity normal to the wall is set to the wall velocity in this direction, but the fluid velocity parallel to the wall is unrestricted) in elementary analyses of inviscid flow, where the effect of boundary layers is neglected.

The no-slip condition poses a problem in viscous flow theory at contact lines: places where an interface between two fluids meets a solid boundary. Here, the no-slip boundary condition implies that the position of the contact line does not move, which is not observed in reality. Analysis of a moving contact line with the no slip condition results in infinite stresses that can't be integrated over. The rate of movement of the contact line is believed to be dependent on the angle the contact line makes with the solid boundary, but the mechanism behind this is not yet fully understood.

See also
 Boundary layer
 Wind gradient
 Shear stress
 Shell balance

External links
 No-Slip Condition at ScienceWorld
 How a fluid behaves near a surface
 chimney flow plot movie

References

.

Fluid dynamics
Boundary conditions